Brooke Wilkins-Penfold (born 6 June 1974) is an Australian, former collegiate All-American, retired three-time Olympic Games medalist, left-handed softball pitcher, originally from Sydney, New South Wales. Wilkins played two years from 1994 to 1995 for the Hawaii Rainbow Wahine in the Big West Conference, ranking in career pitching records for both. She later who won a bronze medal at the 1996 Summer Olympics and 2000 Summer Olympics and a silver medal at the 2004 Summer Olympics for Team Australia as a starting pitcher for the national team.

Wilkins attended the University of Hawaii in 1994 and 1995, but did not return to the school after winning bronze in Atlanta.

Career statistics

References

External links
 

1974 births
Living people
Hawaii Rainbow Wahine softball players
Australian softball players
Olympic softball players of Australia
Softball players at the 1996 Summer Olympics
Softball players at the 2000 Summer Olympics
Softball players at the 2004 Summer Olympics
Olympic silver medalists for Australia
Olympic bronze medalists for Australia
Sportswomen from New South Wales
Olympic medalists in softball
Medalists at the 2004 Summer Olympics
Sportspeople from Sydney
Medalists at the 2000 Summer Olympics
Medalists at the 1996 Summer Olympics